In enzymology, a Zn2+-exporting ATPase is an enzyme that catalyzes the chemical reaction

ATP + H2O + Zn2+in  ADP + phosphate + Zn2+out

The 3 substrates of this enzyme are ATP, H2O, and Zn2+, whereas its 3 products are ADP, phosphate, and Zn2+.

This enzyme belongs to the family of hydrolases, specifically those acting on acid anhydrides to catalyse transmembrane movement of substances. The systematic name of this enzyme class is ATP phosphohydrolase (Zn2+-exporting). Other names in common use include Zn(II)-translocating P-type ATPase, P1B-type ATPase, and AtHMA4 (the A. thaliana protein).

Structural studies 

Moreover, nanobodies have recently been raised against a zinc-transporting ATPase (ZntA) which are able to bind and inhibit the ATPase activity, showing potential for further structural studies.

References 

 
 
 
 
 

EC 3.6.3
Enzymes of known structure